Funtoosh is a 1956 Hindi film directed by Chetan Anand. The film stars Dev Anand, Sheila Ramani and K. N. Singh. It was the ninth highest-grossing film of 1956, and was declared a "Hit". The music of the movie was an instant hit and songs such as "Dukhi Man Mere" were topping Binaca Geet Mala. Other hits were "Woh Dekhe To Unki Inayat", "Hamen Aaj Koi Na Chhediyo", "Ae Meri Topi Palat Ke Aa" and "Denewala Jab bhi Deta". The Songs cemented the bond of S. D. Burman, Dev Anand and Kishore Kumar.

Plot
Ram goes crazy after the death of his mother and sister, and once released from mental hospital he comes across Mr Kirorilal, who insures him and wants him dead for the money. However, Ram ends up marrying his daughter.

Cast
 Dev Anand as Ram Lal "Funtoosh"
 Sheila Ramani as Neelu
 K.N. Singh as Karodimal

Soundtrack
The film music was composed by Sachin Dev Burman, assisted by his son R. D. Burman when he was 17 years old he composed the tune of "Ae Mere Topi Palat Ke Aa". The lyrics were by Sahir Ludhianvi.

References

External links
 

1956 films
1950s Hindi-language films
Films directed by Chetan Anand
Films scored by S. D. Burman
Indian comedy-drama films
1956 comedy-drama films